St. Rita's Church is a parish church governed by the Roman Catholic Archdiocese of New York, in Staten Island, New York City, founded in 1921. Named for the same saint, the Bronx parish of St. Rita of Cascia was established in 1900.

References

External links
 Church of St. Rita official site
 St. Rita School official site

Roman Catholic churches in Staten Island